Daniel Emmanuel Asafo-Agyei was a Ghanaian politician and merchant. He replaced Cobina Kessie as the member of parliament for the Kumasi North constituency in 1959 when the latter took up a diplomatic appointment as Ghana's ambassador to Liberia. Asafo-Agyei represented Kumasi North from 1959 until 1965 when he became the member of parliament for the Manhyia constituency. While in parliament, he was appointed deputy minister for Agriculture and in 1965 he was appointed minister for Fisheries (a new ministry that had been created at the time). He served in this capacity until February 1966 when the Nkrumah government was overthrown.

See also
 List of MLAs elected in the 1956 Gold Coast legislative election
 List of MPs elected in the 1965 Ghanaian parliamentary election

References

Date of birth missing
Date of death missing
Ghanaian MPs 1956–1965
Ghanaian MPs 1965–1966
Convention People's Party (Ghana) politicians
20th-century Ghanaian politicians
1890 births